Jorge Samuel Caballero Álvarez (born 24 December 1974 in Puerto Lempira, Gracias a Dios department, Honduras) is a retired Honduran football defender.

He currently is the president of Honduran national league club Deportes Savio.

Club career
Caballero began his career with hometown club Deportivo Melgar. He then joined Olimpia, playing with the team from 1996 until transferring overseas in 2001. The central defender moved to Serie A to play for Udinese, where his second season was hampered by a long knee injury lay-off. He would remain in Udine until moving to Salernitana in 2004. He only played in 2 cup games for them and then signed for Nacional in Uruguay, but the move did not materialise since Nacional had too many foreigners in their squad, so he joined Defensor Sporting instead. In Uruguay he was unlucky with injuries again.

At the start of 2005, he moved to Major League Soccer and the Chicago Fire. Caballero had a disappointing 2005 with the club, and was released. He spent the 2006 preseason with the Colorado Rapids.

China
Caballero had a lengthy spell with Chinese side Changchun Yatai and played in the 2008 AFC Champions League with them.
In the 2008-2009 Winter Market it was reported that two teams from Honduras, Marathon and Olimpia, were interested in the signing of Samuel Caballero after he publicly stated his desire to return to Honduras in order to be close to family and return to the National Team. However, the player still had a contract with the Chinese Club Changchun Yatai and stated that if he did not receive any offers he would return to the club and complete his contract.

Career end controversy
In summer 2011 he finally returned to Honduras to sign with Necaxa and declared the team would be his final before retiring. However, he would never play for the club since he was still contracted to Changchun Yatai and they did not give him permission to play for Necaxa.

International career
Caballero has played an important part at the national team setup for over 10 years, mostly playing alongside other Honduran greats like Amado Guevara, Julio César de León and Carlos Pavón.
He made his debut for Honduras in a January 1998 friendly match against Costa Rica and has earned a total of 71 caps, scoring 11 goals. He has represented his country in 22 FIFA World Cup qualification matches and played at the 1999 UNCAF Nations Cup as well as at the 1998, 2000, 2005 and 2007 CONCACAF Gold Cups. Also, he played at the 2001 Copa América. and was one of three of Honduras' over-age players at the 2008 Summer Olympics.

His final international was a March 2009 FIFA World Cup qualification match against Trinidad & Tobago.

International goals
Scores and results list Honduras' goal tally first.

Retirement
In October 2012, Caballero was named president of Deportes Savio.

Honours
C.D. Olimpia
Liga Nacional de Fútbol de Honduras: 2000–01

Nacional
Uruguayan Primera División: 2004 Apertura

Changchun Yatai
Chinese Super League: Champion 2007
Chinese Super League: Runner-Up 2009
Chinese Super League: Footballer of the Year (MVP)

Individual
 CONCACAF Gold Cup Best XI: 2005
 CONCACAF Gold Cup All-Tournament team (Honorable Mention): 2007

References

External links

 Caballero profile – FIFA
 
 Stats – Gazzetta

1974 births
Living people
People from Puerto Lempira
Association football defenders
Honduran footballers
Honduras international footballers
1998 CONCACAF Gold Cup players
2000 CONCACAF Gold Cup players
2001 Copa América players
2005 CONCACAF Gold Cup players
2007 CONCACAF Gold Cup players
Footballers at the 2008 Summer Olympics
Olympic footballers of Honduras
C.D. Olimpia players
Udinese Calcio players
U.S. Salernitana 1919 players
Defensor Sporting players
Chicago Fire FC players
Changchun Yatai F.C. players
Liga Nacional de Fútbol Profesional de Honduras players
Serie A players
Uruguayan Primera División players
Major League Soccer players
Honduran expatriate footballers
Honduran expatriate sportspeople in Italy
Honduran expatriate sportspeople in China
Expatriate footballers in Italy
Expatriate footballers in Uruguay
Expatriate soccer players in the United States
Expatriate footballers in China
Chinese Super League players